Sigmund von Birken (25 April 1626 – 12 June 1681) was a German poet of the Baroque. He was born in Wildstein, near Eger, and died in Nuremberg, aged 55.

His pupil, Sibylle Ursula von Braunschweig-Lüneburg wrote part of a novel, Die Durchlauchtige Syrerin Aramena (Aramena, the noble Syrian lady), which when complete would be the most famous courtly novel in German Baroque literature; it was finished by her brother Anton Ulrich and edited by Sigmund von Birken.

Further reading

References

External links 
 
 
 
 
 
 Collection of links from the Freie Universität Berlin

1626 births
1681 deaths
People from Cheb District
People from the Kingdom of Bohemia
German Bohemian people
German Protestants
German poets
German male poets
Baroque writers